Adam Karabec (born 2 July 2003) is a Czech footballer who currently plays as a midfielder for Sparta Prague. He was included in The Guardian's "Next Generation" list for 2020.

Club career 
After a long spell in the youth academy of Bohemians 1905, which he had joined at the age of six, in 2016 Karabec gained a move to fellow Prague-based club Sparta Prague and began making it through the Letenští's youth squads. By the beginning of the 2019–20 season, Karabec was already a member of Sparta's under-19 squad, despite being only sixteen. In July 2019, he was named "Player of the Tournament" in the CEE Cup. By September 2019, he had also begun to play for the reserve team in their regional group of the national third division.

It took less than five months to the midfielder to impress the then head coach Václav Jílek and gain a call-up to join the first team. Karabec subsequently made his professional debut on February 23, 2020, coming on as a replacement for David Moberg Karlsson at the 88th minute of his side's 1–0 loss against Sigma Olomuc. After collecting other three appearances as a substitute and scoring his first goal in a 1–4 win against Karviná, he also made his first start on June 10, 2020, as he featured in Sparta's 2–0 win against Opava and got replaced by Georges Mandjeck at the 76th minute.

International career 
A youth international for Czech Republic at several levels, in September 2020, Karabec got called-up for the first time both by the Under-21 and the senior national teams.

On September 2, 2020, he made his debut for the former squad against San Marino, registering an assist for Václav Drchal's opener (the match ended up in a 6–0 win); exactly one week later, he was featured on the bench in the latter side's UEFA Nations League match against Scotland.

In March 2021, he was selected to take part in the UEFA European Under-21 Championship in Hungary and Slovenia.

Career statistics

Club

Notes

Honours and achievements

Individual
Awards
 Czech Talent of the Year: 2021

References

External links
 

2003 births
Living people
Czech footballers
Czech Republic youth international footballers
Association football midfielders
Bohemians 1905 players
AC Sparta Prague players
Czech First League players
Czech Republic under-21 international footballers